Surya Daham is a 1979 Malayalam language film based on the novel of the same name by Perumbadavam Sreedharan. It is directed by Mohan. Perumbadavam Sreedharan won the Kerala State Film Award for Best Story and the Kerala Film Critics Association Award for Best Story for the film.

References

1979 films
1970s Malayalam-language films
Films directed by Mohan
Films based on Indian novels